Jung Woo-sung (Hangul: 정우성, born January 2, 1996), better known by his stage name Olltii (Hangul: 올티), is a South Korean rapper. He was a contestant on Show Me the Money 3. He released his first album, Graduation, on February 24, 2015.

Discography

Studio albums

Singles

References

1996 births
Living people
South Korean male rappers
South Korean hip hop singers
21st-century South Korean male  singers